Plough Lane Chapel or Plough United Reformed Church is a historic building in Brecon, Wales. The chapel's foundation dates to the 17th century and the structure was rebuilt in 1841, then again in 1892. Cadw, the historic environment service of the Welsh Government, listed the chapel as a Grade II* historic building in 1976 for its "unusual porch" and "elaborate and fine interior".

The chapel takes its name from a public house called The Plough on whose site the chapel was built in the 1690s. The present building dates back to 1841 and was re-modelled by Owen Morris Roberts in 1892. Particularly notable is the beautiful woodwork of the gallery fronts and pulpit. The vestry contains memorial plaques from the former Glamorgan Street Congregational Church. Off the vestry is also the splendid “Minister’s toilet” with a lavishly decorated toilet pan.

References

External links
Chapels Heritage Society
Brecon Beacons Pastorate

Plough Lane Chapel Gallery

Grade II* listed churches in Powys
Chapels in Powys
Brecon